Blessed is the stage name of Peter Skinner, a Jamaican-Canadian reggae musician. He is most noted as a two-time Juno Award winner for [[Juno Award for Reggae Recording of the Year|Reggae Recording of the Year]], winning at the Juno Awards of 2002 for "Love (African Woman)" and at the Juno Awards of 2006 for "Reggae Time".

Originally from Seaforth Town in Jamaica's Saint Thomas Parish, Skinner moved to Toronto, Ontario in the late 1980s, and began his musical career performing with the Redd Flames sound system. Most of his releases have been individual singles, although he has also released a full-length album and several mixtapes.

In addition to his two Juno Award wins, he has been nominated in the reggae category nine other times over the course of his career.

Singles

References

21st-century Black Canadian male singers
Canadian reggae musicians
Jamaican reggae musicians
Jamaican emigrants to Canada
People from Saint Thomas Parish, Jamaica
Musicians from Toronto
Juno Award for Reggae Recording of the Year winners
Living people
Year of birth missing (living people)